Chora District is a district of Uruzgan Province, Afghanistan.  The district center is the town of Chora, with a population of about 3,000.  It is a rural town with no industry beyond livestock, agriculture, and small merchants.

A ribbon-cutting ceremony was held to officially open the Tarinkot to Chora Road Oct. 4, 2011. The Dutch State Secretary, Ben Knapen, along with the Uruzgan provincial governor, Mohammed Sherzad, held the ribbon-cutting ceremony to celebrate the completion of construction of the road that will better connect the Chora district to the provincial capital city by cutting travel time between the two by more than half.

District profile:
 Villages: 100
 Schools: 21 primary, 2 high schools.
 Health centers: 1.

References

External links 
 Summary of the District Development Plan, 2006

Districts of Urozgan Province